Diodora minuta is a species of sea snail, a marine gastropod mollusk in the family Fissurellidae, the keyhole limpets.

Description

Distribution

References

Fissurellidae
Taxa named by Jean-Baptiste Lamarck
Gastropods described in 1822